The highly urbanized city of Manila is currently represented in the House of Representatives of the Philippines by its six congressional districts. Every three years, each district elects one representative who will sit on their behalf in Congress. In addition, each district is allotted six seats in the Manila City Council, with councilors being elected every three years.

History 
Areas now under the jurisdiction of Manila were initially represented as part of the at-large district of the province of Manila in the Malolos Congress from 1898 to 1899; the district elected four representatives.

The city of Manila, chartered in 1901, first gained separate representation in 1907. It was initially divided into two representative districts from 1907 to 1949. When seats for the upper house of the Philippine Legislature were elected from territory-based districts between 1916 and 1935, the city formed part of the fourth senatorial district which elected two out of the 24-member Senate.

In the disruption caused by the Second World War, Manila was incorporated into the City of Greater Manila on January 1, 1942 through Manuel Quezon's Executive Order No. 400 as a wartime emergency measure. Greater Manila was represented by two delegates in the National Assembly of the Japanese-sponsored Second Philippine Republic: one was the city mayor (an ex officio member), while the other was elected through a citywide assembly of KALIBAPI members during the Japanese occupation of the Philippines.

Upon the restoration of the Philippine Commonwealth in 1945, Manila's pre-war two-district representation was retained; this remained so until 1949. By virtue of the Revised Charter of the City of Manila, enacted on June 18, 1949, the city was divided into four congressional districts. The city elected four representatives from the 2nd Congress up to the 7th Congress.

The city was represented in the Interim Batasang Pambansa as part of Region IV from 1978 to 1984, and elected six representatives, at large, to the Regular Batasang Pambansa in 1984.

Manila was reapportioned into six congressional districts under the new Constitution which was proclaimed on February 11, 1987. It elected members to the restored House of Representatives starting that same year.

Current districts 
The city was last apportioned upon the proclamation of the 1987 Constitution, where it was granted six seats in Congress. The city's current congressional delegation composes of two members of Lakas-CMD, one member of Aksyon Demokratiko, one member of the National Unity Party and one member of the Nationalist People's Coalition. All six representatives are part of the majority bloc in the 19th Congress.

Notes

At-large (defunct)

1898–1899 
 encompasses Manila province

1943–1944 
 includes Quezon City and the following municipalities from Rizal: Caloocan, Makati, Mandaluyong, Parañaque, Pasay, San Juan

1984–1986

References 

Districts of Manila
Geography of Manila
Politics of Manila
Legislative districts of Metro Manila
Manila